Lake Seminole is a freshwater lake in urban Pinellas County in the U.S. state of Florida.

Once a tidal estuary, Lake Seminole was created in the 1940s by closing the upper portion of Long Bayou. Lake Seminole's watershed is unusually small for a lake of its size, draining only approximately 5.5 miles of the county, in mostly developed Seminole and Largo. Historically the watershed was much larger than its current limits, but was altered in the early 1970s to divert runoff into Long Bayou for flood relief. Due to the low volume of water, and the nutrient and pollutant rich drainage from the urbanized area surrounding the lake, water quality has been a concern, with the county developing the Lake Seminole Watershed Management Plan to protect water quality and habitat.

On the east shore of Lake Seminole is Lake Seminole Park, a 250 acre county park that provides year-round public access to the lake. Popular activities on the lake include boating, jet skiing, water-skiing, and fishing. The park is also popular with families and nature enthusiasts, and includes a two-mile multi-use trail that winds through pine flat woods, a softball field, and volleyball courts.

References

External links
Information at Pinellas County website

Seminole
Lakes of Pinellas County, Florida